Mstislav Romanovich the Old (died 1223) was Prince of Pskov (1179–?), Smolensk (1197–?), Belgorod (1206), Halych (?–?) and Grand Prince of Kiev (Kyiv, 1212–1223). He was the son of Roman Rostislavich.

Mstislav defeated an invading Hungarian army in 1221. In April 1223, the Mongols of Genghis Khan sent an envoy of ten ambassadors to negotiate a surrender or alliance. The Russians haughtily executed them all. The Mongol commanders Subodei and Jebe defeated and captured him three days after the Battle of the Kalka River at a palisade on a nearby hill. According to the Novgorod Chronicle, of the large Russian army sent out to fight the Mongols, only "every tenth returned to his home." For the first time since the attack of the Huns on Europe over seven centuries earlier, an Asian force had invaded Europe and utterly annihilated a major army.

An account of Mstislav's execution after the battle is described in Jack Weatherford's historical book Genghis Khan and the Making of the Modern World:

At the end of the campaign, Subodei and Jebe led their soldiers down to spend a relaxing spring in the Crimea on the Black Sea. They celebrated their victory with a great drunken party that lasted for days. The guest of honor was the defeated Prince Mstislav and his two sons-in-law, but their treatment showed how much the Mongols had changed since the time of Genghis Khan. The Mongols wrapped the three of them in felt rugs, as befitted high-ranking aristocrats, and stuffed them beneath the floorboards of their ger, thereby slowly, but bloodlessly, crushing the men as the Mongols drank and sang through the night on the floor above them. It was important to the Mongols that the Russians understand the severe penalty for killing ambassadors, and it was equally as important for the Mongol leaders to reaffirm to their own men the extent to which they would always be willing to go to avenge the unjust killing of a Mongol.

1223 deaths
Grand Princes of Kiev
Rurik dynasty
Deaths from asphyxiation
Executed Russian people
13th-century princes in Kievan Rus'
Eastern Orthodox monarchs
13th-century executions
People executed by smothering
People executed by the Mongol Empire
Executed Ukrainian people
Year of birth unknown
Rostislavichi family (Smolensk)